Sartuul is one of the Mongol clans. They are sometimes confused with the Sartuuls, a group of captured artisans from Central Asia. However, their name is originated from Sart Uul (Mountain with the Moon), the name of a mountain where they live. During the Chinese Qing dynasty rule, there was a banner named Tsetsen Sartuul's hoshuu (Wise Sartuul's banner) and descendants of the banner began to use its name as a clan name when Mongolians began using their ancestors' clan names after 1990.

9 khutagts of Khalkha and 2 presidents of Mongolia are from the Tsetsen Sartuul's hoshuu.

See also 
 List of modern Mongol clans
 List of medieval Mongol tribes and clans

References 

History of Mongolia
Mongol peoples